

Offseason 
In March 1952, during spring training, shortstop Granny Hamner was named captain of the team by manager Eddie Sawyer.

Notable transactions 
 December 10, 1951: Andy Seminick, Eddie Pellagrini, Dick Sisler, and Niles Jordan were traded by the Phillies to the Cincinnati Reds for Smoky Burgess, Howie Fox and Connie Ryan.

Regular season

Season standings

Record vs. opponents

Notable transactions 
 April 29, 1952: John Anderson was signed as an amateur free agent by the Phillies.
 May 23, 1952: Bubba Church was traded by the Phillies to the Cincinnati Reds for Kent Peterson and Johnny Wyrostek.
 August 30, 1952: Tommy Glaviano was selected off waivers by the Phillies from the St. Louis Cardinals.

Game log

|- style="background:#bbb"
| – || April 15 || @ Giants || colspan=6 | Postponed (rain); Makeup: September 4
|- style="background:#fbb"
| 1 || April 16 || @ Giants || 3–5 || Sal Maglie (1–0) || Robin Roberts (0–1) || None || 17,472 || 0–1
|- style="background:#bfb"
| 2 || April 17 || @ Giants || 5–3 (11) || Jim Konstanty (1–0) || George Spencer (0–1) || None || 13,697 || 1–1
|- style="background:#fbb"
| 3 || April 18 || Braves || 2–3 || Lew Burdette (1–0) || Russ Meyer (0–1) || None || 15,911 || 1–2
|- style="background:#fbb"
| 4 || April 19 || Braves || 7–9 || Bert Thiel (1–0) || Andy Hansen (0–1) || Lew Burdette (1) || 9,466 || 1–3
|- style="background:#bfb"
| 5 || April 20 (1) || Braves || 4–3 (10) || Robin Roberts (1–1) || Lew Burdette (1–1) || None || see 2nd game || 2–3
|- style="background:#fbb"
| 6 || April 20 (2) || Braves || 1–2 || Dave Cole (1–0) || Karl Drews (0–1) || Dick Donovan (1) || 26,011 || 2–4
|- style="background:#fbb"
| 7 || April 21 || Giants || 4–10 || Jim Hearn (1–0) || Howie Fox (0–1) || Dave Koslo (1) || 14,609 || 2–5
|- style="background:#fbb"
| 8 || April 22 || Giants || 1–4 || Larry Jansen (1–0) || Russ Meyer (0–2) || None || 12,405 || 2–6
|- style="background:#bbb"
| – || April 23 || Dodgers || colspan=6 | Postponed (rain); Makeup: August 9 as a traditional double-header
|- style="background:#bbb"
| – || April 24 || Dodgers || colspan=6 | Postponed (rain); Makeup: August 11 as a traditional double-header
|- style="background:#bbb"
| – || April 25 || @ Braves || colspan=6 | Postponed (rain); Makeup: July 3
|- style="background:#bfb"
| 9 || April 26 || @ Braves || 8–0 || Robin Roberts (2–1) || Vern Bickford (0–1) || None || 1,893 || 3–6
|- style="background:#bbb"
| – || April 27 (1) || @ Braves || colspan=6 | Postponed (rain); Makeup: August 5 as a traditional double-header
|- style="background:#bbb"
| – || April 27 (2) || @ Braves || colspan=6 | Postponed (rain); Makeup: August 6 as a traditional double-header
|- style="background:#bfb"
| 10 || April 29 || @ Cubs || 8–2 || Curt Simmons (1–0) || Bob Rush (1–2) || None || 8,484 || 4–6
|- style="background:#fbb"
| 11 || April 30 || @ Cubs || 8–9 (12) || Dutch Leonard (1–0) || Howie Fox (0–2) || None || 7,221 || 4–7
|-

|- style="background:#bfb"
| 12 || May 1 || @ Cardinals || 6–3 || Robin Roberts (3–1) || Cliff Chambers (1–1) || None || 5,596 || 5–7
|- style="background:#fbb"
| 13 || May 2 || @ Cardinals || 2–3 || Vinegar Bend Mizell (1–2) || Russ Meyer (0–3) || None || 9,462 || 5–8
|- style="background:#fbb"
| 14 || May 3 || @ Cardinals || 0–3 || Cloyd Boyer (1–0) || Karl Drews (0–2) || None || 5,676 || 5–9
|- style="background:#fbb"
| 15 || May 4 (1) || @ Reds || 4–5 || Ewell Blackwell (1–3) || Curt Simmons (1–1) || Frank Smith (3) || see 2nd game || 5–10
|- style="background:#fbb"
| 16 || May 4 (2) || @ Reds || 7–8 || Harry Perkowski (2–1) || Howie Fox (0–3) || Frank Smith (4) || 19,780 || 5–11
|- style="background:#bfb"
| 17 || May 6 || @ Pirates || 6–0 || Robin Roberts (4–1) || Don Carlsen (0–1) || None || 9,008 || 6–11
|- style="background:#fbb"
| 18 || May 7 || @ Pirates || 1–5 || Howie Pollet (1–3) || Russ Meyer (0–4) || None || 7,291 || 6–12
|- style="background:#bbb"
| – || May 8 || @ Pirates || colspan=6 | Postponed (rain, wet grounds); Makeup: July 17 as a traditional double-header
|- style="background:#bfb"
| 19 || May 10 (1) || @ Dodgers || 4–0 || Karl Drews (1–2) || Ralph Branca (2–2) || None || see 2nd game || 7–12
|- style="background:#bfb"
| 20 || May 10 (2) || @ Dodgers || 8–1 || Robin Roberts (5–1) || Clem Labine (0–1) || None || 31,777 || 8–12
|- style="background:#fbb"
| 21 || May 11 || @ Dodgers || 3–4 (10) || Carl Erskine (2–0) || Howie Fox (0–4) || None || 9,104 || 8–13
|- style="background:#bbb"
| – || May 12 || @ Dodgers || colspan=6 | Postponed (cold, wet grounds); Makeup: July 2 as a traditional double-header
|- style="background:#bfb"
| 22 || May 13 || Cubs || 6–0 || Curt Simmons (2–1) || Joe Hatten (2–2) || None || 5,702 || 9–13
|- style="background:#bfb"
| 23 || May 14 || Cubs || 9–2 || Russ Meyer (1–4) || Bob Kelly (1–3) || None || 3,212 || 10–13
|- style="background:#bfb"
| 24 || May 15 || Reds || 5–1 || Robin Roberts (6–1) || Ewell Blackwell (1–5) || None || 14,752 || 11–13
|- style="background:#bfb"
| 25 || May 16 || Reds || 3–2 (10) || Ken Heintzelman (1–0) || Herm Wehmeier (3–2) || None || 19,313 || 12–13
|- style="background:#fbb"
| 26 || May 17 || Reds || 3–7 || Frank Hiller (4–2) || Howie Fox (0–5) || None || 5,285 || 12–14
|- style="background:#fbb"
| 27 || May 18 || Cardinals || 3–4 || Gerry Staley (7–1) || Russ Meyer (1–5) || Al Brazle (6) || 12,380 || 12–15
|- style="background:#bbb"
| – || May 19 || Cardinals || colspan=6 | Postponed (rain); Makeup: June 17 as a traditional double-header
|- style="background:#bbb"
| – || May 20 || Pirates || colspan=6 | Postponed (rain); Makeup: June 16
|- style="background:#bfb"
| 28 || May 21 || Pirates || 7–3 || Robin Roberts (7–1) || Murry Dickson (1–7) || None || 6,202 || 13–15
|- style="background:#bfb"
| 29 || May 22 || Pirates || 6–0 || Curt Simmons (3–1) || Red Munger (0–2) || None || 3,065 || 14–15
|- style="background:#fbb"
| 30 || May 23 || Dodgers || 1–5 || Ben Wade (3–1) || Karl Drews (1–3) || None || 30,323 || 14–16
|- style="background:#fbb"
| 31 || May 24 || Dodgers || 0–5 || Billy Loes (5–0) || Russ Meyer (1–6) || None || 15,894 || 14–17
|- style="background:#bbb"
| – || May 25 || Dodgers || colspan=6 | Postponed (rain); Makeup: September 2
|- style="background:#bbb"
| – || May 26 || Braves || colspan=6 | Postponed (rain); Makeup: May 27 as a traditional double-header
|- style="background:#fbb"
| 32 || May 27 (1) || Braves || 2–4 (12) || Warren Spahn (4–3) || Ken Heintzelman (1–1) || Lew Burdette (4) || see 2nd game || 14–18
|- style="background:#bfb"
| 33 || May 27 (2) || Braves || 5–4 (10) || Andy Hansen (1–1) || Sheldon Jones (0–1) || None || 27,225 || 15–18
|- style="background:#bfb"
| 34 || May 29 || Giants || 6–5 || Karl Drews (2–3) || Hoyt Wilhelm (4–1) || Ken Heintzelman (1) || 3,919 || 16–18
|- style="background:#bfb"
| 35 || May 30 (1) || Giants || 3–0 || Russ Meyer (2–6) || Max Lanier (1–3) || None || see 2nd game || 17–18
|- style="background:#fbb"
| 36 || May 30 (2) || Giants || 2–4 || Larry Jansen (4–1) || Robin Roberts (7–2) || None || 31,273 || 17–19
|- style="background:#fbb"
| 37 || May 31 || @ Pirates || 3–5 || Joe Muir (2–1) || Lou Possehl (0–1) || Woody Main (1) || 6,425 || 17–20
|-

|- style="background:#bfb"
| 38 || June 1 (1) || @ Pirates || 5–1 || Curt Simmons (4–1) || Murry Dickson (2–8) || None || see 2nd game || 18–20
|- style="background:#fbb"
| 39 || June 1 (2) || @ Pirates || 1–2 || Ted Wilks (2–2) || Karl Drews (2–4) || None || 15,529 || 18–21
|- style="background:#fbb"
| 40 || June 3 || @ Reds || 1–2 || Frank Smith (2–1) || Robin Roberts (7–3) || None || 6,441 || 18–22
|- style="background:#fbb"
| 41 || June 4 || @ Reds || 8–10 || Frank Smith (3–1) || Ken Heintzelman (1–2) || None || 6,075 || 18–23
|- style="background:#fbb"
| 42 || June 5 || @ Reds || 3–5 || Harry Perkowski (5–2) || Karl Drews (2–5) || None || 2,459 || 18–24
|- style="background:#fbb"
| 43 || June 6 || @ Cardinals || 4–5 || Al Brazle (3–0) || Jim Konstanty (1–1) || None || 7,512 || 18–25
|- style="background:#bfb"
| 44 || June 7 || @ Cardinals || 4–3 || Jim Konstanty (2–1) || Bill Werle (0–1) || None || 10,391 || 19–25
|- style="background:#fbb"
| 45 || June 8 || @ Cardinals || 3–5 || Willard Schmidt (1–2) || Russ Meyer (2–7) || Eddie Yuhas (1) || 10,399 || 19–26
|- style="background:#fbb"
| 46 || June 10 || @ Cubs || 5–10 || Paul Minner (6–1) || Karl Drews (2–6) || None || 10,125 || 19–27
|- style="background:#fbb"
| 47 || June 11 || @ Cubs || 2–3 || Turk Lown (3–2) || Curt Simmons (4–2) || Dutch Leonard (3) || 10,765 || 19–28
|- style="background:#fbb"
| 48 || June 12 || @ Cubs || 1–3 || Warren Hacker (4–1) || Robin Roberts (7–4) || None || 9,646 || 19–29
|- style="background:#bfb"
| 49 || June 14 || Pirates || 4–2 || Russ Meyer (3–7) || Bob Friend (3–8) || Jim Konstanty (1) || 5,033 || 20–29
|- style="background:#fbb"
| 50 || June 15 (1) || Pirates || 0–6 || Howie Pollet (2–7) || Karl Drews (2–7) || None || see 2nd game || 20–30
|- style="background:#bfb"
| 51 || June 15 (2) || Pirates || 6–3 || Howie Fox (1–5) || Murry Dickson (4–9) || Jim Konstanty (2) || 12,525 || 21–30
|- style="background:#bfb"
| 52 || June 16 || Pirates || 5–4 || Jim Konstanty (3–1) || Paul LaPalme (1–1) || None || 2,210 || 22–30
|- style="background:#bfb"
| 53 || June 17 (1) || Cardinals || 2–1 || Curt Simmons (5–2) || Bill Werle (1–2) || None || see 2nd game || 23–30
|- style="background:#fbb"
| 54 || June 17 (2) || Cardinals || 0–4 || Al Brazle (4–1) || Robin Roberts (7–5) || Eddie Yuhas (2) || 22,854 || 23–31
|- style="background:#fbb"
| 55 || June 18 || Cardinals || 1–7 || Joe Presko (4–3) || Russ Meyer (3–8) || None || 9,973 || 23–32
|- style="background:#fbb"
| 56 || June 19 || Cardinals || 4–6 || Cloyd Boyer (3–3) || Howie Fox (1–6) || Al Brazle (10) || 7,751 || 23–33
|- style="background:#bfb"
| 57 || June 20 || Reds || 3–1 || Robin Roberts (8–5) || Ewell Blackwell (2–8) || None || 6,367 || 24–33
|- style="background:#bbb"
| – || June 21 || Reds || colspan=6 | Postponed (rain); Makeup: July 29 as a traditional double-header
|- style="background:#fbb"
| 58 || June 22 (1) || Reds || 3–5 || Frank Smith (6–3) || Andy Hansen (1–2) || None || see 2nd game || 24–34
|- style="background:#bfb"
| 59 || June 22 (2) || Reds || 3–0 (7) || Karl Drews (3–7) || Herm Wehmeier (4–4) || None || 6,891 || 25–34
|- style="background:#bbb"
| – || June 23 || Cubs || colspan=6 | Postponed (rain); Makeup: June 24 as a traditional double-header
|- style="background:#bfb"
| 60 || June 24 (1) || Cubs || 6–0 || Robin Roberts (9–5) || Bob Rush (9–4) || None || see 2nd game || 26–34
|- style="background:#bfb"
| 61 || June 24 (2) || Cubs || 2–1 || Russ Meyer (4–8) || Johnny Klippstein (4–5) || Jim Konstanty (3) || 13,102 || 27–34
|- style="background:#fbb"
| 62 || June 25 || Cubs || 1–4 || Bob Kelly (2–4) || Karl Drews (3–8) || Dutch Leonard (4) || 5,128 || 27–35
|- style="background:#bfb"
| 63 || June 27 || Giants || 6–0 || Curt Simmons (6–2) || Larry Jansen (6–4) || None || 13,569 || 28–35
|- style="background:#bfb"
| 64 || June 28 || Giants || 7–2 || Robin Roberts (10–5) || Jim Hearn (8–2) || None || 17,182 || 29–35
|- style="background:#fbb"
| 65 || June 29 || Giants || 3–12 || Hoyt Wilhelm (6–2) || Russ Meyer (4–9) || Max Lanier (4) || 12,034 || 29–36
|- style="background:#bfb"
| 66 || June 30 || @ Dodgers || 4–0 || Karl Drews (4–8) || Carl Erskine (7–2) || None || 21,377 || 30–36
|-

|- style="background:#fbb"
| 67 || July 1 || @ Dodgers || 3–4 || Clem Labine (5–2) || Jim Konstanty (3–2) || None || 7,184 || 30–37
|- style="background:#bfb"
| 68 || July 2 (1) || @ Dodgers || 4–3 || Robin Roberts (11–5) || Chris Van Cuyk (5–5) || None || see 2nd game || 31–37
|- style="background:#bfb"
| 69 || July 2 (2) || @ Dodgers || 2–1 || Russ Meyer (5–9) || Ben Wade (6–5) || Andy Hansen (1) || 17,216 || 32–37
|- style="background:#bfb"
| 70 || July 3 || @ Braves || 2–0 || Curt Simmons (7–2) || Jim Wilson (7–6) || None || 1,232 || 33–37
|- style="background:#fbb"
| 71 || July 4 (1) || @ Braves || 1–2 (11) || Lew Burdette (4–3) || Karl Drews (4–9) || None || see 2nd game || 33–38
|- style="background:#fbb"
| 72 || July 4 (2) || @ Braves || 2–3 || Vern Bickford (3–9) || Ken Heintzelman (1–3) || None || 7,610 || 33–39
|- style="background:#bfb"
| 73 || July 5 || @ Giants || 3–2 || Howie Fox (2–6) || Larry Jansen (7–5) || None || 12,691 || 34–39
|- style="background:#fbb"
| 74 || July 6 (1) || @ Giants || 0–2 || Max Lanier (3–4) || Robin Roberts (11–6) || None || see 2nd game || 34–40
|- style="background:#bfb"
| 75 || July 6 (2) || @ Giants || 4–1 || Russ Meyer (6–9) || Sal Maglie (11–4) || None || 24,238 || 35–40
|- style="background:#bbcaff;"
| – || July 8 ||colspan="7" |1952 Major League Baseball All-Star Game at Shibe Park in Philadelphia
|- style="background:#fbb"
| 76 || July 10 || @ Cardinals || 3–10 || Gerry Staley (12–6) || Curt Simmons (7–3) || None || 13,416 || 35–41
|- style="background:#bfb"
| 77 || July 11 || @ Cardinals || 4–3 (10) || Robin Roberts (12–6) || Al Brazle (6–2) || None || 13,020 || 36–41
|- style="background:#fbb"
| 78 || July 12 || @ Cardinals || 2–3 || Harry Brecheen (4–3) || Russ Meyer (6–10) || Eddie Yuhas (4) || 10,355 || 36–42
|- style="background:#bfb"
| 79 || July 13 (1) || @ Cubs || 7–3 || Karl Drews (5–9) || Warren Hacker (6–3) || Andy Hansen (2) || see 2nd game || 37–42
|- style="background:#bfb"
| 80 || July 13 (2) || @ Cubs || 9–2 || Steve Ridzik (1–0) || Bob Rush (9–7) || Jim Konstanty (4) || 29,065 || 38–42
|- style="background:#bbb"
| – || July 14 || @ Cubs || colspan=6 | Postponed (rain); Makeup: August 24 as a traditional double-header
|- style="background:#bfb"
| 81 || July 15 || @ Pirates || 10–3 || Curt Simmons (8–3) || Howie Pollet (3–10) || None || 10,244 || 39–42
|- style="background:#bfb"
| 82 || July 16 || @ Pirates || 8–7 || Robin Roberts (13–6) || Murry Dickson (6–14) || Andy Hansen (3) || 2,569 || 40–42
|- style="background:#fbb"
| 83 || July 17 (1) || @ Pirates || 1–2 || Cal Hogue (1–0) || Russ Meyer (6–11) || None || see 2nd game || 40–43
|- style="background:#fbb"
| 84 || July 17 (2) || @ Pirates || 2–4 || Ted Wilks (5–4) || Karl Drews (5–10) || None || 5,304 || 40–44
|- style="background:#bfb"
| 85 || July 18 || @ Reds || 7–5 || Jim Konstanty (4–2) || Frank Hiller (4–6) || Russ Meyer (1) || 6,424 || 41–44
|- style="background:#bfb"
| 86 || July 19 || @ Reds || 7–5 || Karl Drews (6–10) || Bud Podbielan (0–1) || None || 2,215 || 42–44
|- style="background:#fbb"
| 87 || July 20 (1) || @ Reds || 5–6 (10) || Frank Smith (8–7) || Russ Meyer (6–12) || None || see 2nd game || 42–45
|- style="background:#bfb"
| 88 || July 20 (2) || @ Reds || 4–3 || Robin Roberts (14–6) || Bubba Church (1–6) || None || 9,170 || 43–45
|- style="background:#bfb"
| 89 || July 22 (1) || Pirates || 14–4 || Russ Meyer (7–12) || Cal Hogue (1–1) || None || see 2nd game || 44–45
|- style="background:#bfb"
| 90 || July 22 (2) || Pirates || 8–1 || Karl Drews (7–10) || Woody Main (2–8) || Andy Hansen (4) || 11,213 || 45–45
|- style="background:#bfb"
| 91 || July 23 || Pirates || 4–1 || Steve Ridzik (2–0) || Bob Friend (4–15) || Robin Roberts (1) || 4,611 || 46–45
|- style="background:#fbb"
| 92 || July 25 || Cubs || 3–8 || Warren Hacker (8–3) || Curt Simmons (8–4) || None || 10,802 || 46–46
|- style="background:#bfb"
| 93 || July 26 || Cubs || 7–2 || Robin Roberts (15–6) || Johnny Klippstein (6–8) || None || 4,312 || 47–46
|- style="background:#bfb"
| 94 || July 27 (1) || Cubs || 12–8 || Andy Hansen (2–2) || Paul Minner (9–7) || Jim Konstanty (5) || see 2nd game || 48–46
|- style="background:#bfb"
| 95 || July 27 (2) || Cubs || 3–0 || Karl Drews (8–10) || Bob Rush (10–8) || None || 11,134 || 49–46
|- style="background:#bfb"
| 96 || July 29 (1) || Reds || 6–1 || Curt Simmons (9–4) || Ewell Blackwell (2–11) || None || see 2nd game || 50–46
|- style="background:#bfb"
| 97 || July 29 (2) || Reds || 4–3 || Andy Hansen (3–2) || Ken Raffensberger (10–9) || None || 19,055 || 51–46
|- style="background:#bfb"
| 98 || July 30 || Reds || 7–3 || Robin Roberts (16–6) || Frank Smith (8–9) || None || 7,505 || 52–46
|-

|- style="background:#fbb"
| 99 || August 1 || Cardinals || 5–10 || Eddie Yuhas (8–2) || Andy Hansen (3–3) || None || 18,778 || 52–47
|- style="background:#bfb"
| 100 || August 2 || Cardinals || 6–2 || Karl Drews (9–10) || Gerry Staley (13–10) || Robin Roberts (2) || 12,889 || 53–47
|- style="background:#bfb"
| 101 || August 3 || Cardinals || 6–0 || Curt Simmons (10–4) || Joe Presko (6–6) || None || 13,715 || 54–47
|- style="background:#bbb"
| – || August 5 (1) || @ Braves || colspan=6 | Postponed (rain); Makeup: August 7 as a traditional double-header
|- style="background:#bbb"
| – || August 5 (2) || @ Braves || colspan=6 | Postponed (rain); Makeup: August 31 as a traditional double-header
|- style="background:#bbb"
| – || August 6 (1) || @ Braves || colspan=6 | Postponed (rain); Makeup: August 30 as a traditional double-header
|- style="background:#bbb"
| – || August 6 (2) || @ Braves || colspan=6 | Postponed (rain); Makeup: September 6 in Philadelphia as a traditional double-header
|- style="background:#bfb"
| 102 || August 7 (1) || @ Braves || 2–1 || Robin Roberts (17–6) || Vern Bickford (7–11) || None || see 2nd game || 55–47
|- style="background:#bfb"
| 103 || August 7 (2) || @ Braves || 10–2 || Russ Meyer (8–12) || Jim Wilson (10–9) || None || 4,829 || 56–47
|- style="background:#fbb
| 104 || August 8 || Dodgers || 3–6 (10) || Preacher Roe (8–1) || Curt Simmons (10–5) || None || 16,163 || 56–48
|- style="background:#fbb"
| 105 || August 9 (1) || Dodgers || 0–6 || Billy Loes (10–5) || Karl Drews (9–11) || None || see 2nd game || 56–49
|- style="background:#fbb"
| 106 || August 9 (2) || Dodgers || 2–4 || Johnny Rutherford (4–2) || Steve Ridzik (2–1) || None || 34,606 || 56–50
|- style="background:#bbb"
| – || August 10 || Dodgers || colspan=6 | Postponed (rain); Makeup: September 2 as a traditional double-header
|- style="background:#bfb"
| 107 || August 11 (1) || Dodgers || 7–2 || Robin Roberts (18–6) || Ben Wade (11–7) || None || see 2nd game || 57–50
|- style="background:#fbb"
| 108 || August 11 (2) || Dodgers || 5–9 || Joe Black (8–2) || Howie Fox (2–7) || None || 39,705 || 57–51
|- style="background:#bbb"
| – || August 12 || Braves || colspan=6 | Postponed (rain); Makeup: August 13 as a traditional double-header
|- style="background:#bfb"
| 109 || August 13 (1) || Braves || 3–0 || Karl Drews (10–11) || Vern Bickford (7–12) || None || see 2nd game || 58–51
|- style="background:#fbb"
| 110 || August 13 (2) || Braves || 3–9 || Max Surkont (8–10) || Curt Simmons (10–6) || None || 11,280 || 58–52
|- style="background:#bfb"
| 111 || August 14 || Braves || 5–3 || Russ Meyer (9–12) || Warren Spahn (11–12) || None || 3,391 || 59–52
|- style="background:#bfb"
| 112 || August 15 || @ Dodgers || 8–3 || Robin Roberts (19–6) || Joe Landrum (1–1) || None || 18,182 || 60–52
|- style="background:#fbb"
| 113 || August 16 || @ Dodgers || 0–15 (7) || Billy Loes (11–6) || Curt Simmons (10–7) || None || 7,219 || 60–53
|- style="background:#bfb"
| 114 || August 17 || @ Dodgers || 2–1 || Karl Drews (11–11) || Carl Erskine (11–5) || None || 18,863 || 61–53
|- style="background:#bfb"
| 115 || August 19 || @ Pirates || 10–5 || Robin Roberts (20–6) || Ron Necciai (0–2) || None || 11,207 || 62–53
|- style="background:#bfb"
| 116 || August 20 || @ Pirates || 3–1 || Russ Meyer (10–12) || Cal Hogue (1–5) || None || 2,755 || 63–53
|- style="background:#fbb"
| 117 || August 22 || @ Reds || 2–3 || Bud Podbielan (1–2) || Andy Hansen (3–4) || None || 9,915 || 63–54
|- style="background:#fbb"
| 118 || August 23 || @ Reds || 2–3 || Frank Smith (9–9) || Karl Drews (11–12) || None || 3,617 || 63–55
|- style="background:#fbb"
| 119 || August 24 (1) || @ Cubs || 0–3 || Warren Hacker (11–6) || Robin Roberts (20–7) || None || see 2nd game || 63–56
|- style="background:#bfb"
| 120 || August 24 (2) || @ Cubs || 14–4 || Russ Meyer (11–12) || Paul Minner (11–9) || None || 33,820 || 64–56
|- style="background:#bfb"
| 121 || August 25 || @ Cubs || 6–3 (10) || Andy Hansen (4–4) || Turk Lown (4–9) || None || 6,505 || 65–56
|- style="background:#fbb"
| 122 || August 26 || @ Cubs || 2–3 (13) || Bob Schultz (4–2) || Andy Hansen (4–5) || None || 7,019 || 65–57
|- style="background:#bfb"
| 123 || August 27 || @ Cardinals || 7–2 || Curt Simmons (11–7) || Vinegar Bend Mizell (8–6) || None || 9,129 || 66–57
|- style="background:#bfb"
| 124 || August 28 || @ Cardinals || 10–6 || Robin Roberts (21–7) || Harry Brecheen (6–5) || None || 7,632 || 67–57
|- style="background:#bfb"
| 125 || August 30 (1) || @ Braves || 4–2 || Karl Drews (12–12) || Lew Burdette (6–8) || None || see 2nd game || 68–57
|- style="background:#bfb"
| 126 || August 30 (2) || @ Braves || 8–6 || Andy Hansen (5–5) || Warren Spahn (12–15) || None || 5,277 || 69–57
|- style="background:#fbb"
| 127 || August 31 (1) || @ Braves || 0–1 || Virgil Jester (2–4) || Steve Ridzik (2–2) || None || see 2nd game || 69–58
|- style="background:#bfb"
| 128 || August 31 (2) || @ Braves || 4–0 || Jim Konstanty (5–2) || Max Surkont (10–11) || None || 6,920 || 70–58
|-

|- style="background:#bbb"
| – || September 1 (1) || Dodgers || colspan=6 | Postponed (rain); Makeup: September 23 in Brooklyn as a traditional double-header
|- style="background:#bbb"
| – || September 1 (2) || Dodgers || colspan=6 | Postponed (rain); Makeup: September 24 in Brooklyn
|- style="background:#bfb"
| 129 || September 2 (1) || Dodgers || 8–2 || Robin Roberts (22–7) || Ben Wade (11–8) || None || see 2nd game || 71–58
|- style="background:#bfb"
| 130 || September 2 (2) || Dodgers || 9–3 || Karl Drews (13–12) || Ray Moore (1–1) || None || 28,582 || 72–58
|- style="background:#fbb"
| 131 || September 3 || @ Giants || 3–4 (10) || Bill Connelly (3–0) || Andy Hansen (5–6) || None || 15,984 || 72–59
|- style="background:#fbb"
| 132 || September 4 || @ Giants || 3–4 (11) || Al Corwin (4–0) || Russ Meyer (11–13) || None || 5,219 || 72–60
|- style="background:#fbb"
| 133 || September 5 || @ Giants || 4–5 || Al Corwin (5–0) || Jim Konstanty (5–3) || Sal Maglie (1) || 5,391 || 72–61
|- style="background:#bfb"
| 134 || September 6 (1) || Braves || 7–6 (17) || Robin Roberts (23–7) || Bob Chipman (1–1) || None || see 2nd game || 73–61
|- style="background:#fbb"
| 135 || September 6 (2) || Braves || 1–3 || Ernie Johnson (5–1) || Karl Drews (13–13) || Lew Burdette (7) || 12,474 || 73–62
|- style="background:#bfb"
| 136 || September 7 || Braves || 2–1 || Steve Ridzik (3–2) || Lew Burdette (6–9) || None || 6,011 || 74–62
|- style="background:#fbb"
| 137 || September 9 || Cardinals || 4–7 || Eddie Yuhas (9–2) || Curt Simmons (11–8) || Harry Brecheen (2) || 9,254 || 74–63
|- style="background:#bfb"
| 138 || September 10 || Cardinals || 6–3 || Steve Ridzik (4–2) || Vinegar Bend Mizell (10–7) || Jim Konstanty (6) || 7,157 || 75–63
|- style="background:#bfb"
| 139 || September 11 || Cardinals || 3–2 || Robin Roberts (24–7) || Cliff Chambers (4–4) || None || 9,177 || 76–63
|- style="background:#fbb"
| 140 || September 12 (1) || Cubs || 1–5 || Paul Minner (13–9) || Karl Drews (13–14) || None || see 2nd game || 76–64
|- style="background:#fbb"
| 141 || September 12 (2) || Cubs || 0–7 || Bob Kelly (4–9) || Bob Miller (0–1) || None || 8,571 || 76–65
|- style="background:#bfb"
| 142 || September 14 (1) || Pirates || 5–2 || Curt Simmons (12–8) || Cal Hogue (1–7) || None || see 2nd game || 77–65
|- style="background:#bfb"
| 143 || September 14 (2) || Pirates || 2–1 || Russ Meyer (12–13) || Jim Waugh (1–6) || None || 7,238 || 78–65
|- style="background:#bfb"
| 144 || September 16 || Reds || 4–2 || Robin Roberts (25–7) || Niles Jordan (0–1) || None || 8,690 || 79–65
|- style="background:#bfb"
| 145 || September 17 || Reds || 7–4 || Karl Drews (14–14) || Frank Hiller (5–8) || None || 3,089 || 80–65
|- style="background:#bfb"
| 146 || September 19 || Giants || 1–0 || Curt Simmons (13–8) || Sal Maglie (17–8) || None || 10,882 || 81–65
|- style="background:#bfb"
| 147 || September 20 || Giants || 3–2 || Robin Roberts (26–7) || Al Corwin (6–1) || None || 21,712 || 82–65
|- style="background:#bfb"
| 148 || September 21 || Giants || 6–2 || Russ Meyer (13–13) || Jim Hearn (14–7) || None || 12,891 || 83–65
|- style="background:#fbb"
| 149 || September 23 (1) || @ Dodgers || 4–5 || Johnny Rutherford (7–7) || Karl Drews (14–15) || None || see 2nd game || 83–66
|- style="background:#bfb"
| 150 || September 23 (2) || @ Dodgers || 1–0(12) || Curt Simmons (14–8) || Jim Hughes (2–1) || Kent Peterson (1) || 24,408 || 84–66
|- style="background:#bfb"
| 151 || September 24 || @ Dodgers || 9–7 || Robin Roberts (27–7) || Clem Labine (8–4) || None || 2,136 || 85–66
|- style="background:#fbb"
| 152 || September 26 || @ Giants || 0–8 || Sal Maglie (18–8) || Russ Meyer (13–14) || Hoyt Wilhelm (11) || 1,684 || 85–67
|- style="background:#bfb"
| 153 || September 27 || @ Giants || 7–3 || Paul Stuffel (1–0) || Mario Picone (0–1) || Kent Peterson (2) || 3,535 || 86–67
|- style="background:#bfb"
| 154 || September 28 || @ Giants || 7–4 || Robin Roberts' (28–7) || Jack Harshman (0–2) || None || 5,933 || 87–67
|-

| style="text-align:left;" |
The second game on June 22, 1952, was called after 7 innings due to darkness. Contemporary newspaper accounts, as well as Retrosheet, indicate that the Cincinnati Reds protested the game, but Baseball-Reference.com does not indicate that an official protest had occurred.
The original game schedule indicated Pittsburgh at Philadelphia for single games on July 22, 23, and 24.
The second game on September 6 was suspended (Pennsylvania curfew) in the bottom of the eighth inning with the score 1–3 and was completed September 7, 1952.
The original game schedule indicated Chicago at Philadelphia for single games on September 12 and 13.

 Roster 

 Player stats 

 Batting 

 Starters by position Note: Pos = Position; G = Games played; AB = At bats; H = Hits; Avg. = Batting average; HR = Home runs; RBI = Runs batted in Other batters Note: G = Games played; AB = At bats; H = Hits; Avg. = Batting average; HR = Home runs; RBI = Runs batted in Pitching 

 Starting pitchers Note: G = Games pitched; IP = Innings pitched; W = Wins; L = Losses; ERA = Earned run average; SO = Strikeouts Other pitchers Note: G = Games pitched; IP = Innings pitched; W = Wins; L = Losses; ERA = Earned run average; SO = Strikeouts Relief pitchers Note: G = Games pitched; W = Wins; L = Losses; SV = Saves; ERA = Earned run average; SO = Strikeouts''

Awards and honors

League leaders 
 Robin Roberts, National League Leader, Wins (28)

Farm system 

LEAGUE CHAMPIONS: Terre Haute, Miami

Notes

References 
1952 Philadelphia Phillies season at Baseball Reference

Philadelphia Phillies seasons
Philadelphia Phillies season
Philadelphia